Rebecca Ott (born 9 August 1994) is an Australian-New Zealand professional basketball player and Australian rules footballer.

Basketball career

WNBL
After impressive performances for the Knox Raiders in the semi-professional Big V competition, Ott was signed by the Melbourne Boomers for the 2016–17 season. In March 2017, Ott was re-signed for her second season with the Boomers after strong showings in her debut season. This season, Ott will play alongside the likes of Liz Cambage & Jenna O'Hea.

National team

Due to her New Zealand parentage, Ott was encouraged to attend the Tall Ferns training camp by her Boomers and Tall Ferns assistant coach, Guy Molloy. Ott has been selected in the final roster for the 2017 FIBA Asia Women's Cup, there she will make her international debut.

Australian rules football career
Ott was elevated to the St Kilda squad as an injury replacement player before the 2021 AFL Women's season. She made her AFLW debut in the round 4 match against Geelong. Her season was ended a few weeks later when she injured her knee playing in the VFL Women's league. In June 2021, she extended her contract by a year.

References

External links

1994 births
Living people
Australian women's basketball players
New Zealand women's basketball players
Australian people of New Zealand descent
Melbourne Boomers players
Basketball players from Melbourne
Guards (basketball)
St Kilda Football Club (AFLW) players
Australian rules footballers from Victoria (Australia)